Snake Island Lake is a lake in the Ottawa River drainage basin in Strathy Township, Municipality of Temagami, Nipissing District of Northeastern Ontario, Canada.

The primary outflow is a navigable channel to Cassels Lake, which flows via Rabbit Lake, the Matabitchuan River and Lake Timiskaming into the Ottawa River.

See also
Lakes of Temagami

References

Strathy Township
Lakes of Temagami